Stiglitz Commission is a short name given for two commissions led by the US economist Joseph E. Stiglitz:

 Commission of Experts on Reforms of the International Monetary and Financial System, convened by the President of the United Nations General Assembly Miguel d'Escoto Brockmann
 Commission on the Measurement of Economic Performance and Social Progress, convened by the French Government